Downe House or Down House may refer to:

Downe House School, a girls' boarding school in Berkshire, England
Down House, Charles Darwin's home in the village of Downe in the London Borough of Bromley
Downe House, Richmond Hill, previously home of Mick Jagger and Jerry Hall
Down House (film), a 2001 Russian comedy film

See also
Downs House (disambiguation)